The National School of Sciences and Arts of Cuzco is a public school in Cuzco, Peru. According to the Congress of Peru, it's the oldest school in Peru.

The premises of the Jesuits were given as the premises and as income those that belonged to the Bethlehemites, to the consolidated schools, to the Census Fund, and to the temporalities of the department.

Since 1972 the property is part of the Monumental Zone of Cuzco declared as a Historical Monument of Peru. Likewise, in 1983, being part of the historic center of Cuzco, it is part of the central area declared by UNESCO as a World Heritage Site.

See also
National University of San Marcos, the oldest university of Peru

References

High schools and secondary schools in Peru